Events from the year 1699 in Sweden

Incumbents
 Monarch – Charles XII

Events

 
 

 
 - The king has a relapse in the Gottorp Fury upon the visit of his brother-in-law. 
 August - A French theater company, La troupe du Roi de Suede is engaged to perform drama, opera and ballet at the Swedish royal court.

Births

 
 
 
 
 unknown - Afrosinya, serf mistress of Alexei Petrovich, Tsarevich of Russia (died 1748)

Deaths

 
 

 24 July - Axel Wachtmeister, Count of Mälsåker, field marshal  (born 1643)
 Maria Eriksdotter, bank robber.

References

 
Years of the 17th century in Sweden
Sweden